Irukkam is a lake island located in the middle of Pulicat Lake in the Tiruvallur district of Tamil Nadu. It is located 6 km from Arambakkam. In recent times, Irukkam has emerged as a popular island resort owing to its proximity to Chennai.

Transportation

Irukkam is located nearly 8 kilometers from Arambakkam. Transportation to the island is only possible by boat.

References

Islands of Andhra Pradesh
Populated places in India
Islands of India